Samal Mojah Duggins (born 13 November 1984) is a politician from Saint Kitts and Nevis who has served in the government of Terrance Drew since 2022.

References 

1984 births
Living people
Saint Kitts and Nevis Labour Party politicians

Agriculture ministers of Saint Kitts and Nevis
People from Saint Kitts
University of the West Indies alumni